Maciej Zworski  is a Polish, Canadian mathematician, currently a professor of mathematics at the University of California, Berkeley. His mathematical interests include  microlocal analysis, scattering theory, and partial differential equations.

He was an invited speaker at International Congress of Mathematicians in Beijing in 2002, and a plenary speaker at the conference Dynamics, Equations and Applications in Kraków in 2019.

Selected publications

Articles

Books
 with Richard Melrose and Antônio Sá Barreto: Semi-linear diffraction of conormal waves, Astérisque, vol. 240, Societé Mathématique de France, 1996 abstract
 Semiclassical analysis, American Mathematical Society 2012
 as editor with Plamen Stefanov and András Vasy: 
 with Semyon Dyatlov:

References

External links
Professor Zworski's webpage

Living people
Polish emigrants to Canada
Canadian mathematicians
20th-century American mathematicians
21st-century American mathematicians
University of California, Berkeley College of Letters and Science faculty
1963 births
Fellows of the American Academy of Arts and Sciences